Lac-Frontière is a municipality in Montmagny Regional County Municipality within the Chaudière-Appalaches region of Quebec. It is located at the border (frontière in French) with the United States.

See also
Northwest Branch Saint John River, a stream
List of municipalities in Quebec

References

Municipalities in Quebec
Incorporated places in Chaudière-Appalaches